Love in Thoughts is a German film directed by Achim von Borries. It was released in Germany on February 12, 2004. The main characters are played by August Diehl, Daniel Brühl, Anna Maria Mühe and Jana Pallaske.

Plot
The movie takes place in late 1920s Berlin. It opens with Paul being questioned by police about a note he had written. The scene then fades out, and the movie shows what happened. Paul, a shy virgin poet who is tired of being alone and heartbroken, is friends with an openly gay aristocrat boy, Guenther, who is suffering unrequited love for Hans. Paul is staying at Guenther's parents' country home over the weekend. The parents are absent. Guenther's sister Hilde, who stole Hans' heart besides, is loved by Paul, for whom Guenther has budding feelings, which complicates the brother-sister relationship. Hilde has no interest in committing to a relationship with Paul, however. Guenther invites some people over to have an all-night party, filled with alcohol, music, and sex. It is one of their last parties, since Paul and Guenther have made a suicide pact. Guenther, Paul, Hans and Hilde go through a series of couplings, conversation and partying before proceeding to Hilde and Guenther's parents' apartment in the city. There the drama ends with gunshots. The question is what actually happened. The film is based on a "true" story, the so-called "Steglitz school tragedy".

Cast
  
 Daniel Brühl as Paul Krantz
 August Diehl as Günther Scheller
 Anna Maria Mühe as Hilde Scheller
 Jana Pallaske as Elli
 Thure Lindhardt as Hans
 Verena Bukal as Rosa
 Julia Dietze as Lotte
 Buddy Elias as Dr. Frey
 Luc Feit as Zipfer
 Marius Frey as Bittner
 Holger Handtke as Wieland
 Jonas Jägermeyr as Pit
 Roman Kaminski as Vorsitzender bei Gericht (Chairman)
 Christoph Luser as Macke
 Tino Mewes as Django
 Thomas Neumann as Kommissar Peters
 Thomas Schendel as Kommissar Kraus
 Fabian Oscar Wien as Fritz
 Jürgen Wink as Lehrer Krähe
 Melek Diehl as Partyguest
 Clemens Fickweiler as Partyguest
 Daniel Hischer as Partyguest
 Nele Kalau as Partyguest
 Monika Küpker as Partyguest
 Kai Krambeer as Partyguest
 Bodo Maier as Partyguest
 Ivonne Meyer as Partyguest
 Nicolai Paschke as Partyguest
 Helena Pistor as Partyguest
 Olga Regier as Partyguest
 Anna-Zoe Schmidt as Partyguest (as Zoe Schmidt)
 Michael Schreiber as Partyguest
 Undine Spiller as Partyguest
 Ivan Shvedoff as Gast im Moka Efti (as Iwan Shvedoff)

Awards
Won
2005: German Film Critics Association Awards - for Best Actor: August Diehl
2004: Copenhagen International Film Festival - Golden Swan for Best actress: Anna Maria Mühe
2004: European Film Awards - Audience Award for Best Actor: Daniel Brühl
2004: New Faces Awards, Germany - for Best Director: Achim von Borries
2004: Undine Awards, Austria - for Best Young Actor - Film: August Diehl
2004: Verona Love Screens Film Festival - for Best Film: Love in Thoughts
Nominated
2005: German Camera Award - for Feature Film: Jutta Pohlmann
2004: Brussels European Film Festival - Golden Iris : Love in Thoughts

External links

Official website 
Love in Thoughts: Film review at Filmcritic.com

2004 films
2004 drama films
2000s German-language films
German LGBT-related films
German drama films
Films set in 1927
Films set in Berlin
LGBT-related drama films
Films about suicide
2004 LGBT-related films
2000s German films